David Galbraith (born 20 December 1983) is an English footballer.

Career
Galbraith plays as a left sided midfielder, he joined Boston United in 2005 initially on loan from Northampton Town and is a former trainee at Tottenham Hotspur. He re-signed for the club after their double relegation, making him one of three players remaining from the previous season. on 31 January 2008 Galbraith signed for Kettering Town.

In the summer of 2009, along with Stephan Morley, Galbraith signed for King's Lynn but was released by the club's manager, Carl Heggs following the Linnets defeat in a pre-season friendly game.

Personal life
Galbraith attended Putteridge High School in Luton.
Works with Freddie Knight at Mida Civils.

References

External links 

1983 births
Living people
English footballers
Tottenham Hotspur F.C. players
Northampton Town F.C. players
Boston United F.C. players
Kettering Town F.C. players
King's Lynn F.C. players
St Albans City F.C. players
Arlesey Town F.C. players
English Football League players
Association football midfielders